Cityscape is an album by the composer, arranger and conductor Claus Ogerman and the saxophonist Michael Brecker. It was released in 1982 by Warner Bros. Records. It was produced by Tommy LiPuma.

Reception 
AllMusic awarded the album 4 stars and its review by James Manheim stated that it was one of Ogerman's "most successful works, not least because the overlap between the extended harmonies of jazz and the chromaticism of the late German Romantic polyphony in which Ogerman was trained is large enough to allow Brecker to operate comfortably – his improvisations seem to grow naturally out of the background, and the intersections between jazz band and orchestral strings come more easily here than on almost any other crossover between jazz and classical music".

The composition "In the Presence and Absence of Each Other (Parts 1, 2 and 3)" was nominated for a  Grammy Award for Best Instrumental Composition at the 1982 Grammy Awards.

Artwork 
The album cover features a lithograph by the Ukrainian-born artist Louis Lozowick, called New York (1923).

Track listing 
All compositions by Claus Ogerman.
 "Cityscape"  – 8:46
 "Habanera"  – 8:06
 "Nightwings"  – 7:44
 "In the Presence and Absence of Each Other (Part 1)"  – 8:56
 "In the Presence and Absence of Each Other (Part 2)"  – 6:48
 "In the Presence and Absence of Each Other (Part 3)"  – 6:35

Personnel 
Claus Ogerman – arranger, conductor
Michael Brecker – tenor saxophone
Warren Bernhardt – keyboards
Steve Gadd – drums
Eddie Gomez – bass (on "Nightwings" and "Cityscape")
Marcus Miller – bass (on "In the Presence and Absence of Each Other (Part 1, 2 and 3)" and "Habanera")
John Tropea – guitar (on "Habanera")
Buzz Feiten – guitar (on "In the Presence and Absence of Each Other (Part 1)")
Paulinho da Costa – percussion (on "In the Presence and Absence of Each Other (Part 1)" and "Habanera")

References 

1982 albums
Michael Brecker albums
Claus Ogerman albums
Albums produced by Tommy LiPuma
Warner Records albums